"I'm So Tired" is a 1968 song by The Beatles.

I'm So Tired may also refer to:

 "I'm So Tired...", a 2019 song by Lauv and Troye Sivan
 "I'm So Tired" (Fugazi song), a 1999 song by Fugazi

See also 
 So Tired (disambiguation)